Tengushevsky District (Teńgželeń ajmak; , Teńgušbuje) is an administrative and municipal district (raion), one of the twenty-two in the Republic of Mordovia, Russia. It is located in the northwest of the republic. Its administrative center is the rural locality (a selo) of Tengushevo.

Demographics

Population
As of the 2010 Census, the total population of the district was 12,340, with the population of Tengushevo accounting for 34.3% of that number.

Administrative and municipal status
Within the framework of administrative divisions, Tengushevsky District is one of the twenty-two in the republic. The district is divided into ten selsoviets which comprise forty rural localities. As a municipal division, the district is incorporated as Tengushevsky Municipal District. Its ten selsoviets are incorporated into ten rural settlements within the municipal district. The selo of Tengushevo serves as the administrative center of both the administrative and municipal district.

Notable residents 

Alexei Nemov (born 1976 in Barashevo), gymnast
Aleksandr Sharonov (born 1942 in Shoksha), folklorist

References

Notes

Sources

Districts of Mordovia
 
